Adrien "André" Louis Albert Vandelle (29 August 1902 – 16 October 1976) was a French skier.

Vandelle was ranked third internationally in ski jumping in 1923. As a member of the military patrol team he participated at the 1924 Winter Olympics, which won the bronze medal. Individually, he finished 20th at the Nordic combined event and 29th at the 18 km cross-country skiing competition.

References

External links
 sports-reference.com

1902 births
1976 deaths
French military patrol (sport) runners
French male cross-country skiers
French male Nordic combined skiers
French male ski jumpers
Olympic biathletes of France
Olympic cross-country skiers of France
Olympic Nordic combined skiers of France
Nordic combined skiers at the 1924 Winter Olympics
Military patrol competitors at the 1924 Winter Olympics
Cross-country skiers at the 1924 Winter Olympics
Olympic bronze medalists for France
People from Les Rousses
Medalists at the 1924 Winter Olympics
Sportspeople from Jura (department)
20th-century French people